Dolicharthria charonialis is a moth in the family Crambidae. It was described by Francis Walker in 1859. It is found in China. It was previously placed in the Pyraustinae genus Mabra.

References

Moths described in 1859
Spilomelinae